DeMonte' Bolden (born November 17, 1985) is a professional Canadian football defensive tackle for the Calgary Stampeders of the Canadian Football League. He was signed by the Hamilton Tiger-Cats as a street free agent in 2009.

College career
Bolden enrolled in Tennessee as a freshman, and enrolled at Hargrave Military Academy in 2004. Bolden played one game as a freshman in 2005 before becoming a starter in 2006. He started 23 games in his final two seasons but failed to live up to the expectations as the second coming of Albert Haynesworth or John Henderson. Bolden registered 6 sacks in his final season in Knoxville.

References

External links
Calgary Stampeders bio

1985 births
Living people
People from Chattanooga, Tennessee
Canadian football defensive linemen
Tennessee Volunteers football players
Hamilton Tiger-Cats players
Calgary Stampeders players
African-American players of Canadian football
21st-century African-American sportspeople
20th-century African-American people